is a half-hour anime series, directed by Mitsuko Kase and broadcast on Chiba TV, KBS Kyoto, KIDS STATION, Sun TV, Tokyo MX TV, TV Aichi, TV Kanagawa and TV Saitama.

Story

The story follows a group of eclectic characters who form a detective agency through various escapes. With an arching plot concerning the protection of a humanoid character introduced in episode one as "cargo" intended to be a delivery job. 

The cargo is later revealed to be a survivor and escapee from an experiment that attempted to change female human beings into genetically engineered weapons - called the HW series. The HW series were designed to be weapons designed for the military. This is in contrast to the earlier, BW series weapon, which were glass-based and caused targets to become glass for a brief moment of time before bursting into flames.

Characters

The Detectives

The main protagonist of the story and boss of the detective agency, Shu is portrayed as a ladies' man with a brooding, enigmatic persona.

Shū's younger brother, addressed in the program by a nickname he detests, Chi-Boss, given to him by Manami and Ayaka. His role is to get jobs on behalf of the agency.

One of two girls who work for the agency, Manami is a boisterous, unkempt character; she serves as comic relief or the foil in most episodes.

The other girl in the detective agency. Of the two friends, she is quieter and possesses better manners. She is often seen working with her computer.

An effeminate man who acts as either mediator or customer for more difficult jobs that the agency takes on, monitoring everything using several surveillance cameras spread throughout the city.

A skilled doctor cast as the requisite pervert taking photos of his cosplay-prone assistant with different costumes, states one of his mottos in life is, "Without lust, humans are nothing."

The assistant/nurse to the doctor character, she accommodates and enjoys the doctor's fetish for cosplay and inappropriate touching.

The Glass Maidens
 (HW-9)

The cargo who was supposed to be allowed to escape. Her average temperature is around 40 degrees Celsius. She is currently being pursued by an unknown group of women. She hates her designation (HW-9) and has adopted the name given to her by Manami. Her name Sara is derived from the town's name which means freedom. Sara also means silky in Japanese.

BW-Alpha
(nonspeaking character)
A quiet girl who hides her true form which is ultimately fierce and dangerous.

Supporting Characters
Seiji

The guitarist who works part time at a restaurant and a friend of Manami and Yuko.

The Antagonists

The main antagonist and the known leader of the organization who conducts the experiments for both the BW and HW series.

Theme song
Opening theme:
 "Never looking back ~Sukitooru Kokoro de 「Never looking back 〜透き通る心で」" by Rie
Ending theme:
 "qué sera-sera" by TASO (episodes 1–8)
 "Kokoroyo Kaze ni Nare 「こころよ 風になれ」" by TASO (episodes 9–12)

Episodes

References

External links
 Official Glass Maiden/Crystal Blaze Website (Japanese)
 

Action anime and manga
Drama anime and manga
Maiden Japan
Mystery anime and manga
Anime with original screenplays
Anime series
Studio Fantasia